Whine de Lune is the third album by the Alternative Country band Trailer Bride.

Track listing
 "Work on the Railroad" - 2:52
 "Too Many Snakes" - 2:55
 "Crazy Love" - 4:05
 "Felt Like a Sin" - 2:30
 "Clermont Hotel" - 3:20
 "A Song for Emily" - 2:47
 "Left-Hand Cigarette Blues" - 3:02
 "Dirt Nap" - 2:36
 "Sapphire Jewel" - 2:59
 "Whine de Lune" - 3:00
 "Pasture" - 2:39

Personnel
 Brad Goodsby - drums, maracas, tambourine
 Scott Goodsby - guitar, lap steel guitar
 Melissa Swingle - vocals, banjo, guitar, harmonica, mandolin, organ, saw
 Daryl White - bass, background vocals

References

1999 albums
Trailer Bride albums
Bloodshot Records albums